Pepillo Salcedo is a municipality in the Monte Cristi Province of the Dominican Republic, located next to the border with Haiti. Pepillo Salcedo is frequently named Manzanillo due to the bay of manzanillo Bahia De Manzanillo which is approximately 2 miles from playa el coquito coquito beach. the city received its name from José Antonio Salcedo Ramírez who was a combatant in the long war days of the consolidation of national independence day in the Dominican Republic. General Salcedo Ramírez was also an outstanding military leader in the intense restorative war from 1863 to 1865. Pepillo Salcedo is a coastal town. It is built on the shores of the Bay of Manzanillo. In the westernmost part of the Dominican Northwest.

Its official name is Pepillo Salcedo, in accordance with Law 2089, of August 25, 1949, whose literature highlights the historical figure of that character who knew how to defend the concept of Dominicanness by first confronting the Haitians and then the Spanish. This town is also popularly known by the names of Manzanillo and Puerto Libertador. 

The Municipality of Pepillo Salcedo on the Dominican side and Meillac, on the Haitian side, are the starting points of the border of some four hundred kilometers that divides the two countries. The other end of the border line is at Pedernales and Anse-a-Pitre.

Climate

Sources 
 – World-Gazetteer.com

T. (2010, March). PEPILLO SALCEDO: PATRIOTA EXCEPCIONAL. Retrieved June 14, 2020, from https://diariodominicano.com/cultura/2018/03/17/262686/pepillo-salcedo-patriota-excepcional-

References 

Populated places in Monte Cristi Province
Municipalities of the Dominican Republic